Samuel Leeland Simmons (born November 25, 1979) is a former American football wide receiver of the National Football League and Arena Football League. He was drafted by the Miami Dolphins in the fifth round of the 2002 NFL Draft. He played college football at Northwestern.

Simmons was also a member of the Pittsburgh Steelers and Kansas City Brigade.

References

External links
Kansas City Brigade bio

1979 births
Living people
Players of American football from Kansas City, Missouri
American football wide receivers
American football return specialists
Northwestern Wildcats football players
Miami Dolphins players
Pittsburgh Steelers players
Frankfurt Galaxy players
Kansas City Brigade players